There are 62 counties in the state of New York. 

The first 12 were created immediately after the British took over the Dutch colony of New Amsterdam; two of these counties were later abolished, their land going to Massachusetts. The newest is Bronx County, created in 1914 from the portions of New York City that had been annexed from Westchester County in the late 19th century and added to New York County.  New York's counties are named for various Native American words; British provinces, counties, cities, and royalty; early American statesmen and military personnel; and New York State politicians.

The FIPS county code is the five-digit Federal Information Processing Standard (FIPS) code which uniquely identifies counties and county equivalents in the United States. The three-digit number is unique to each individual county within a state, but to be unique within the entire United States, it must be prefixed by the state code. This means that, for example, while Albany County is 001, Addison County, Vermont, and Alachua County, Florida, are also 001. To uniquely identify Albany County, New York, one must use the state code of 36 plus the county code of 001; therefore, the unique nationwide identifier for Albany County, New York, is 36001. The links in the column FIPS County Code are to the Census Bureau's "QuickFacts" page for that county.

Authority
Excepting the five boroughs of New York City, New York counties are governed by NY County Law, and have governments run by either a Board of Supervisors, or a County Legislature, and either an elected County Executive or appointed county manager. Counties without charters are run by a Board of Supervisors, in which Town Supervisors from towns within the county also sit on the county Board of Supervisors. For counties with a charter, the executives generally have powers to veto acts of the county legislature. The legislatures have powers of setting policies, levying taxes and distributing funds.

Five boroughs of New York City

Five of New York's counties are each coextensive with New York City's five boroughs. They are New York County (Manhattan), Kings County (Brooklyn), Bronx County (The Bronx), Richmond County (Staten Island), and Queens County (Queens).

In contrast to other counties of New York, the powers of the five boroughs of New York City are very limited and in nearly all respects are  governed by the city government. Only a few officials are elected on a borough-wide basis, such as the five borough presidents, district attorneys, and all county and state supreme court judges. There are no official county seats, but the locations of borough halls and courthouses bestow certain neighborhoods an informal designation as county seats within their boroughs:

 The Bronx County Courthouse and the borough's main post office are located in the Concourse section of the Bronx. The separate Bronx Borough Hall burned down in 1969.
 Brooklyn Borough Hall, the Federal Building and Post Office, and county Supreme Court are in Downtown Brooklyn.
 The Municipal Building, where the Manhattan Borough President's office is located, and most courthouses are in the downtown Civic Center. The General Post Office is in Midtown Manhattan.
 Queens Borough Hall and a courthouse are in Kew Gardens. Another major courthouse, post office, and the Long Island Railroad hub are in Jamaica. Queens also has general post offices in Flushing, Long Island City and Far Rockaway.
 Staten Island Borough Hall, three courthouses, and the St. George Terminal transportation hub are in the St. George neighborhood.

List of counties

Defunct counties

Proposed new counties

Clickable map

See also 

 List of United States counties and county equivalents
 List of former United States counties
 New York State City/County Management Association

References

External link
"Counties" at NY.gov

 
New York
Counties